Mesosa obscuricornis is a species of beetle in the family Cerambycidae. It was described by Maurice Pic in 1894, originally as a varietas of M. nebulosa. It is known from Iran, Azerbaijan, and Turkey.

References

obscuricornis
Beetles described in 1894